Wikimedia Polska (WMPL) is a Polish public benefit organization established to support volunteers in Poland who work on Wikimedia projects such as Wikipedia. As such, it is a Wikimedia chapter approved by the Wikimedia Foundation which owns and hosts those projects.

Wikimedia Polska was started in April 2005 by a group of Polish Wikipedians at Meta-Wiki. In August of that year 26 first members gathered at a wiki meetup in Kraków to elect the board members and vote on the statute of the new association. It was officially registered on 15 November 2005. On 28 March 2007 Wikimedia Polska was officially inscribed on the list of public benefit organizations held by the Polish Ministry of Justice.

WMPL is headquartered in Warsaw (until 2021 it was headquartered in Łódź). As a Polish chapter of Wikimedia Foundation, the WMPL collaborates with universities, schools, museums and other institutions and has organised events for volunteers aimed at adding content to Foundation projects.

See also
 Open access in Poland

References

 
Wiki communities
Wikimedia Foundation